The chondrophores or porpitids are a small group of hydrozoans in the family Porpitidae. Though it derives from an outdated name for this lineage (see below), some still find the term "chondrophore" useful as a synonym to "porpitid" in discussions of the two genera contained therein.

They all live at the surface of the open ocean, and are colonies of carnivorous, free-floating hydroids whose role in the plankton community is similar to that of pelagic jellyfish. The chondrophores look like a single organism but are actually colonial animals, made up of orderly cooperatives of polyps living under specialized sail-structures.

The most familiar members of the family Porpitidae are the blue button (Porpita porpita) and the by-the-wind sailor (Velella velella).

Description

The tiny individual animals are specialized to perform specific tasks; some form the central gas-filled disc (which is a golden brown colour and hardened by chitinous material) essential to keeping the colony afloat; others form radiating tentacles for tasks such as catching prey, reproduction, and digestion. Microplankton is a chondrophore's principal prey. Although none have powerful stings, contact with the skin may cause irritation. At the mercy of winds and currents, chondrophores are pelagic and drift in the open ocean. They are often seen in large aggregations; mass beachings are not unusual. Chondrophores multiply by releasing tiny (0.3-2.5 millimetres or 0.01-0.09 inches) medusae which go on to develop new colonies.

Velella differs from Porpita by their transparent, membranous sail-shaped floats; filled with gas, the membranes have a texture reminiscent of cellophane. Both genera have turquoise to dark blue mantles and tentacles, with lemon-yellow morphs occasionally encountered. Neither group is particularly large: the floats of Velella are usually under 7.6 centimetres (3 inches) in diameter, while those of Porpita are usually less than 3.8 centimetres (1.5 inches).

Systematics
The order Chondrophora was created by A.K. Totton in 1954 to accommodate these unusual genera of Hydrozoa as their taxonomic affinities were unclear. They had previously been placed either in the Anthomedusae (also known as Athecata) or the Siphonophorae, and though many accepted Totton's placement, a considerable number of authors maintained them in the Anthomedusae/Athecata all the time.

By the 1970s/1980s, nearly all Hydrozoan systematists were in agreement that these genera did indeed belong in that group and the order Chondrophora became defunct, replaced by the family Porpitidae, which took priority over the more recent name Velellidae (the group was subdivided into these two families when still ranked as an order). In modern classifications, the Porpitidae are included in the hydrozoan suborder Capitata.

They are believed to have originated in the late Proterozoic period, some 650-540 million years ago.  A rare soft-bodied fossil that was recovered from the Farmers Member of the Borden Formation (Mississippian age) in northeastern Kentucky was interpreted as a chondrophorine float and potential porpitids were described from the Carrara Formation (lower Cambrian) of California.

Footnotes

References
  (1970): Anthomedusae/Athecatae (Hydrozoa, Cnidaria) of the Mediterranean. Part I. Capitata. Fauna e Flora del Golfo di Napoli 39: 1-96, 11 plates.
  (2008): The Hydrozoa Directory - Subclass Capitata Kühn, 1913. Retrieved 2008-JUL-08.
  (1954): Siphonophora of the Indian Ocean together with systematic and biological notes on related specimens from other oceans. Discovery Reports 27: 1-162.

External links 
Image of various Porpita colour morphs

Porpitidae